From Sun Tzu to Xbox: War and Video Games is a book of video game history written by the journalist and film critic Ed Halter, published in 2006.

Description 

The book decribes the evolution of video games from military-related technologies and contemporary video game related projects by the American military such as America's Army and Full Spectrum Warrior. The book also relates pre-video game relationship between war and games, such as the evolution of chess into kriegspiel.

Reviews 

David Fear of the magazine Time Out found that Ed Halter provided a thorough analysis of the topic, but also attached some personal point of views to the story, which sometimes makes it off-topic.

Quotes 

The technologies that shape our culture have always been pushed forward by war.

Video games were not created directly for military purposes, [they] arose out of an intellectual environment whose existence was entirely predicated on defense research.

A more realistic form of America's Army, for example, would be one in which your soldier might lose a limb or get brain-damaged in combat, then come home to a Sims-style scenario in which you have to manage the rest of your life that way. Or maybe a game where you don't get into combat at all–you just camp out in the desert, running exercises.

See also 

 List of books on computer and video games
 Military–entertainment complex

References

External links 

2006 non-fiction books
Video game culture
Wargaming books
PublicAffairs books
History books about video games